Graciano Rocchigiani (29 December 1963 – 1 October 2018) was a German professional boxer who competed from 1983 to 2003. He held world championships in two weight classes, including the IBF super-middleweight title from 1988 to 1989, and the WBC light-heavyweight title in 1998. At regional level he held the European light-heavyweight title from 1991 to 1992. He was the younger brother of former cruiserweight world champion of boxing, Ralf Rocchigiani.

Professional career
Rocchigiani turned professional in 1983 after a successful amateur career in which he won the 1982 German National Amateur championship in the light-middleweight division. In 1988 he captured the vacant IBF super-middleweight title by stopping Vincent Boulware, and defended the title three times before vacating to step up to the light-heavyweight division. Despite becoming European champion, Rocchigiani failed to secure a world title shot at light-heavyweight and moved back down to super-middleweight in February 1994 to challenge WBO champion Chris Eubank in Berlin, Germany, losing a unanimous decision.

After boxing to a draw with Frederic Seillier for the European super-middleweight title in December 1994, Rocchigiani moved back up to light-heavyweight to challenge the 26-0 Henry Maske IBF title in May 1995 at the Arena Westfalenhalle, Dortmund, Nordrhein-Westfalen. He lost by a disputed unanimous decision despite having Maske reeling numerous times towards the end of the fight, and lost a rematch later in the year, again by unanimous decision. In August 1996 Rocchigiani lost via disqualification to WBO light-heavyweight title holder Dariusz Michalczewski after hitting Michalczewski on the break during round seven. Michalczewski's prolonged, theatrical reaction to the punch was seen by many as way of getting out of a fight he was losing. Initially the result was a technical draw, later changed to a disqualification.

Three weeks after the Michalczewski bout, it was reported that Rocchigiani had tested positive for traces of ephedrine and methylephedrine. However, the German boxing association did not request a follow up test.

In March 1998, Rocchigiani captured the vacant WBC light-heavyweight title by defeating Michael Nunn by split decision at Max Schmeling Halle, Prenzlauer Berg, Berlin, but was demoted to "interim champion" three months later after the WBC inexplicably claimed its references in promotions and contracts to the Rocchigiani-Nunn fight as a championship bout, and to Rocchigiani as the champion in its rankings, had been "typographical errors". A match with WBC title holder Roy Jones Jr. was scheduled for November 1999 after Rocchigiani filed a lawsuit against Jones' promotional companies M&M Sports and Square Ring Promotions Inc due to Jones' reluctance to box Rocchigiani. However, the match was canceled by Jones' promoter Murad Muhammad after Rocchigiani missed a press conference. After initially threatening to strip Jones of his title if he didn't arrange another match with Rocchigiani, the WBC  stripped Rocchigiani outright and removed him from their rankings due to inactivity, which prompted Rocchigiani to file a lawsuit against the WBC. The case went Rocchigiani's way and he was awarded $31m, however the WBC paid a smaller sum, to avoid bankruptcy.

Rocchigiani again challenged Michalczewski for the lineal and WBO titles at Preussag Arena, Hannover, Niedersachsen, Germany in April 2000. By this time Rocchigiani was an aging fighter and despite a strong performance he lost via corner retirement after nine rounds. After a short lived comeback in 2003 after a two-year layoff, he retired from boxing.

Outside of boxing
Although he was a notable champion, Rocchigiani's most significant achievement was his victory in 2003 in the lawsuit against the WBC, in which he was awarded a $31 million judgment for damages over the loss of his light-heavyweight title. The court ruling also retroactively declared him champion from when he beat Nunn until his rematch defeat to Michalczewski. When the WBC announced its intentions to dissolve, he settled for an undisclosed sum.

In 2006, he was sentenced to five months in jail for assaulting a taxi driver.

Graciano was the younger brother of former WBO cruiserweight champion Ralf Rocchigiani, who also served as Graciano's trainer during the latter stages of his career.

He died on 1 October 2018 in Belpasso, Italy when he was run over by a car while taking a walk.

Professional boxing record

See also
List of boxing families

References

External links

German sportspeople of Italian descent
International Boxing Federation champions
World Boxing Council champions
1963 births
2018 deaths
German male boxers
European Boxing Union champions
Middleweight boxers
World super-middleweight boxing champions
World light-heavyweight boxing champions
Road incident deaths in Italy
Sportspeople from Duisburg